TV Ra-Tim-Bum is a Brazilian cable and satellite  TV channel. It is run by the Padre Anchieta Foundation and most of its programming is aimed at children. 
At first the channel's programming consisted entirely of Brazilian productions, though that has changed in recent years.  Many shows are reruns of TV Cultura material, though it also produces and co-produces original content. The channel started operations in December 2004.

In 2007 it became available in the United States. In 2009 the station became available in Portugal.

Programs

Live-action

Current
 1,2,3 agora é sua vez (1,2,3 now turn)
 Baú de Histórias (Chest of Stories)
 Castelo Rá-Tim-Bum (Castle Rá-Tim-Bum)
 Cocoricó
 Como Cuidar do Seu Melhor Amigo (How to Care for Your Best Friend)
 Glub-Glub
 Grandes Personagens (Great Characters)
 Ilha Rá-Tim-Bum (Island Rá-Tim-Bum)
 Lá vem história (There is history)
 Mundo da Lua (World of the Moon)
 Passeio animal (Ride animal)
 Qual É, Bicho? (What is, Bug?)
 Rá-Tim-Bum
 Teatro Rá-Tim-Bum (Theatre Rá-Tim-Bum)
 Vila Sésamo (Sesame Street)
 X-Tudo (X-All)

Canceled
 Ursinhos Carinhosos (Care Bears)
 As Meninas Superpoderosas (The Powerpuff Girls)
 Álbum da Natureza (Album of Nature)
 Bambalalão
 Bebê + (Baby +)
 Catalendas
 Cambalhota (Tumbling)
 Cineminha (Little Cinema)
 Cine Rá-Tim-Bum
 Dando Bandeira (Giving Flag)
 Dango Balango
 Esporte Clube Rá-Tim-Bum (Sports Club Rá-Tim-Bum)
 Sua língua (Its Language)

Cartoon

Current
 A Mansão Maluca do Professor Ambrósio (The Amazing Professor Ambrosius´ Mansion)
 Brichos
 Cantigas de Roda
 Doutor Raio X (Doctor X-Ray)
 Escola pra Cachorro (Doggy Day School)
 Isso Disso (So That)
 Juro que vi (I swear I saw)
 Kiara e os Luminitos (Kiara and the Luminitos)
 Nilba e os Desastronautas (Newbie and the Disasternauts)
 O Papel das Histórias (The Role of Stories)
 Os Caça-Livros (The Hunter-Books)
 Os Ecoturistinhas (The Little Eco-Tourists)
 Os Reciclados (The Recycled)
 Palavras Mágicas (Magic Words)
 Pequenos Cientistas (Little Scientists)
 Portuguesitos Esporte Clube (Portuguesitos Sports Club)
 Quarto do Jobi (Jobi's Room)
 Sidney
 Simão e Bartolomeu (Simão and Bartolomeu)
 Som na Caixa com DJ Cão (Sound Box with DJ Dog)
 Tchibum TV
 Traçando Arte
 T.R.EX.C.I

Canceled

 Abelhinhas (Little Bees)
 Brasil Futebol Clube (Brazil Soccer Club)
 De Onde Vem? (Where Do You Come From?)
 Escola de Princesinhas (Little Princess School)
 Gelê
 Mila e co. (Mila and co.)
 Lanterna Mágica (Magic Lantern)
 O que eu vou ser quando crescer? (What will I be when I grow up?)
 Os Carrinhos (Little Cars)
 Show do DJ Cão (DJ Dog Show)
 Turma do Lambe-Lambe (Lambe-Lambe's Gang)

References

External links
 TV Rá-Tim-Bum

Portuguese-language television stations in Brazil
Television stations in Brazil